Anarchy is a horizontally-scrolling shooter released in 1990 for the Amiga and Atari ST.

Reception

References

External links
Anarchy at Lemon Amiga
Anarchy at Atari Mania

1990 video games
Amiga games
Atari ST games
Horizontally scrolling shooters
Psygnosis games
Video games developed in the United Kingdom